The Kentwell Cup is the major trophy for the New South Wales Suburban Rugby Union (NSWSRU), colloquially known as the "Subbies" competition. It is awarded to the first grade premiers of the first division competition.

The Kentwell Cup was originally presented by W.H. Kentwell, president of the Mosman Rugby Club in 1923 and is still presented to the first grade premiers in first division. The first winners of the Kentwell Cup out of a field of eight was Mosman.

Teams that have played in the competition include those linked by geographical location, such as Drummoyne DRFC, Lane Cove RUFC, and Petersham RUFC; some are linked by connections to schools, such as Old Ignatians, Newington Old Boys (NOBs), St Patrick's Rugby Club and Knox Old Boys; while others have been linked by occupation, like Fire Brigades, Royal Australian Artillery, CBC Bank and Bondi Life Savers.

Premiers
List of Kentwell Cup Premiers since 1923:

Notes

See also

Rugby union in New South Wales
List of Australian club rugby union competitions

References

Rugby union competitions in New South Wales
Recurring sporting events established in 1923
1923 establishments in Australia
Sports leagues established in 1923